The Darjeeling woodpecker (Dendrocopos darjellensis) is a species of bird in the family Picidae.  It is found in the northern regions of the Indian subcontinent, primarily in the Himalayas, and in some adjoining areas.

Description
A medium-sized pied woodpecker with yellow neck sides. Black upperparts with large white, scapular patches and white barred flight feathers and tail sides. Male has red nape patch. White cheeks and long black moustache extending to upper breast. Black-streaked, yellow-buff below with red vent. Long bill.

Distribution 
It is found in Bhutan, India, Myanmar, Nepal and Tibet. Its natural habitats are subtropical or tropical moist lowland forest and subtropical or tropical moist montane forest.

Gallery

References

Darjeeling woodpecker
Birds of Bhutan
Birds of Nepal
Birds of Northeast India
Birds of Yunnan
Darjeeling woodpecker
Darjeeling woodpecker
Taxonomy articles created by Polbot